Mto Panga is a settlement in Kenya's Coast Province.

References 

[ Mto Panga] in [ Geonames.org (cc-by)]

Populated places in Coast Province